
Gmina Krzepice is an urban-rural gmina (administrative district) in Kłobuck County, Silesian Voivodeship, in southern Poland.

Villages
Apart from the town of Krzepice, Gmina Krzepice contains the villages and settlements of Dankowice Drugie, Dankowice Pierwsze, Dankowice Trzecie, Dankowice-Piaski, Lutrowskie, Podłęże Królewskie, Stanki, Starokrzepice, Szarki, Zajączki Drugie and Zajączki Pierwsze.

Neighbouring gminas
Gmina Krzepice is bordered by the gminas of Lipie, Olesno, Opatów, Panki, Przystajń, Radłów and Rudniki.

References

Krzepice
Kłobuck County